The Abu Dhabi Desert Challenge is an international rally raid race held in the Emirate of Abu Dhabi of the United Arab Emirates since 1991. The race is points scoring for the World Rally-Raid Championship and is organized by the Automobile & Touring Club of the United Arab Emirates (ATCUAE), headed by the event founder Mohammed bin Sulayem.

Originally for cars only, motorcycles and quads are allowed since 1995 and trucks since 2002.

The event was originally known as the UAE Desert Challenge, since it spanned several emirates of the country. Since 2009, the route includes five stages (plus a Super Special stage) entirely within the Abu Dhabi emirate, and the title changed to the current one.

Winners

Cars

Motorcycles

References

External links 
 
Read More
 Large MINI contingent at the Abu Dhabi Desert Challenge // Dakar winner Joan “Nani” Roma starts in the MINI ALL4 Racing
 Paulo Gonçalves wins 2014 Abu Dhabi Desert Challenge

Rally raid races
Motorsport competitions in the United Arab Emirates
Tourism in the Emirate of Abu Dhabi
Cross Country Rally World Cup races
1991 establishments in the United Arab Emirates
Recurring sporting events established in 1991